G23 may refer to:
 G-23 (political group), a group of 23 Indian members of parliament
 Glock 23, an Austrian handgun
 Gribovsky G-23, a Soviet experimental aircraft
 Grumman G-23, an American biplane
 , an M-class destroyer of the Royal Navy
 Junkers G 23, a German monoplane
 Shambala language, a Bantu language of Tanzania
 BMW G23, a convertible version of the BMW 4 Series (G22)
 HMS Dagger (G23), a Royal Navy Weapon-class destroyer scrapped prior to completion
 G-23, an alternative name for the G20 developing nations